Michel Fano (born 9 December 1929) is a French musician, composer, writer, filmmaker, and sound designer. During the early 1950s, he was part of a generation of composers associated with the Darmstadt School, and was a lifelong friend of Pierre Boulez. From 1962 until 1975, he regularly collaborated with Alain Robbe-Grillet on cinematic projects, creating  (or "sound-scores") for five of Robbe-Grillet's films.

Works

Compositions 
The following are Fano's acknowledged compositions; numerous works of juvenilia and works-in-progress also exist.

 Sonate pour deux pianos (1952)
 Étude XV (Picc. Fl. Ob. Eh. Cl[E♭]. Cl. Bcl. 2Hn. Ptpt. 2Tpt. Sax. 2Vln. 2Va. 2Vlc. Cb) (1954, premiered 2021)
 La Chambre Secréte (Electronic music with text by Alain Robbe-Grillet)
 Fab V (piano solo, 1995)

Partitions sonores 
 L'Immortelle (1963, dir. Alain Robbe-Grillet)
 Trans-Europ-Express (1966, dir. Alain Robbe-Grillet)
 L'homme qui ment (1968, dir. Alain Robbe-Grillet)
 L'éden et après (1970, dir. Alain Robbe-Grillet)
 Glissements progressifs du plaisir (1974, dir. Alain Robbe-Grillet)

References

External links

French musicians
French filmmakers
French male film score composers
French writers
1929 births
Living people